Baccharis articulata is a species of shrub in the family Asteraceae.

The species was first described by Jean-Baptiste Lamarck, but was later reclassified by Christiaan Hendrik Persoon in 1807. The species is used for a variety of medical uses and is also native to parts of South America.

Medical uses 
It is used in traditional folk medicine for liver diseases. It has also been traditionally used to treat digestive disorders and urinary infections. In Brazil the plant is used to treat diarrhea in cattle.

Distribution 
It is native to Argentina, Bolivia, Brazil, Paraguay, and Uruguay. It can be found in the Paranaese forest. It was also introduced to Spain.

Flowers 
Like almost all baccharis species, Baccharis articulata is dioecious with unisexual flowers. The flowers are visited by Discodon, Apis mellifera, Lucilia sericata, and Ruizantheda divaricata.

In August and September, the plant has multi-petal flowers which are pale greenish yellow.

Common names 
In Portuguese, the species goes by the common name carqueja-branca, carqueja-doce, and carquejinha.

In English, it goes by the common name salt water false willow.

References 

articulata
Flora of Argentina
Flora of Bolivia
Flora of Brazil
Flora of Paraguay
Flora of Uruguay
Medicinal plants of South America